Paraberismyia is a genus of flies in the family Stratiomyidae.

Species
Paraberismyia chiapas Woodley, 2013
Paraberismyia mathisi Woodley, 2013
Paraberismyia triunfo Woodley, 2013
Paraberismyia tzontehuitza Woodley, 1995

References

Stratiomyidae
Brachycera genera
Diptera of North America